Dirty Dingus Magee is a 1970 American comedy revisionist Western film directed by Burt Kennedy and starring Frank Sinatra as the title outlaw and George Kennedy as a sheriff out to capture him. The movie was based on the novel The Ballad of Dingus Magee by David Markson and the screenplay was partly written by Joseph Heller.

Plot
Hoke Birdsill rides into Yerkey's Hole demanding the law take action because Dingus Magee has robbed him. Since no law exists, the mayor, Belle, who also runs the town's bordello, sees to it that Hoke himself becomes the new sheriff. Dingus keeps getting away with his crimes, helped by Anna Hot Water, his young Indian companion, but when he tries to steal from Belle, he finds Hoke has beaten him to it. Hoke enjoys being on the other side of the law, so Dingus turns the tables, becoming sheriff to go after him. After being rivals for so long, Dingus and Hoke eventually team up, burning Belle's brothel to the ground.

Cast
 Frank Sinatra as Dingus Magee
 George Kennedy as Hoke Birdsill
 Anne Jackson as Belle Nops
 Lois Nettleton as Prudence Frost
 Jack Elam as Wesley Hardin (spoofing real-life outlaw John Wesley Hardin)
 Michele Carey as Anna Hot Water
 John Dehner as General George
 Henry Jones as Reverend Green
 Harry Carey, Jr. as Charles Stuart
 Paul Fix as Chief Crazy Blanket
 Terry Wilson as the unnamed Sergeant

Reception
Roger Ebert of the Chicago Sun-Times thought the movie was awful: "I lean toward blaming Frank Sinatra, who in recent years has become notorious for not really caring about his movies. If a shot doesn't work, he doesn't like to try it again; he might be late getting back to Vegas. What's more, the ideal Sinatra role requires him to be in no more than a fourth of the scenes, getting him lots of loot and top billing while his supporting cast does the work."

References

External links
 
 
 
 

1970 films
1970s Western (genre) comedy films
Films directed by Burt Kennedy
Metro-Goldwyn-Mayer films
American Western (genre) comedy films
1970 comedy films
Films based on American novels
1970s English-language films
1970 Western (genre) films
1970s American films